Scolopocerus secundarius is a species of leaf-footed bug in the family Coreidae. It is found in Central America and North America.

References

Articles created by Qbugbot
Insects described in 1875
Coreini